Ernesto Formenti (2 August 1927 – 5 October 1989) was an Italian boxer who won the gold medal in the featherweight division at the 1948 Summer Olympics in London.

Amateur career
Formenti defeated Dennis Shepherd of South Africa in the final to become the Featherweight gold medalist at the 1948 London Olympic Games.

He was born in Cesano Maderno, Milan, Italy.

1948 Olympic results
Below are the Olympic results of Ernesto Formenti, a featherweight boxer who competed for Italy at the 1948 Olympic Games in London:

 Round of 32: defeated Bela Farkus (Hungary) on points
 Round of 16: defeated Kevin Martin (Ireland) on points
 Quarterfinal: defeated Armand Savoie (Canada) on points
 Semifinal: defeated Aleksy Antkiewicz (Poland) on points
 Final: defeated Dennis Shepherd (South Africa) on points (won gold medal)

External links
 
 
 
 
 

1927 births
1989 deaths
Featherweight boxers
Boxers at the 1948 Summer Olympics
Olympic boxers of Italy
Olympic gold medalists for Italy
Olympic medalists in boxing
Medalists at the 1948 Summer Olympics
Italian male boxers
20th-century Italian people